The Zanzibar Football Federation (ZFF) (previously known as Zanzibar Football Association) is the governing football Federation for Zanzibar, Africa.

The ZFA were an associate member of the African governing body, the Confederation of African Football. Following a rejection from FIFA in 2005, the ZFA were removed from CAF and after much lobbying were reinstated as an associate member. This meant that the club sides associated with the ZFA can participate in the continental club competitions organised by CAF but the Zanzibar national team could not. The ZFA are not entitled to vote in CAF affairs due to their associate member status.
Players from Zanzibar are eligible to play in international competition for the Tanzania team, the representative of the sovereign territory.

As a nation state, it has competed in regional competitions since 1949. It currently competes in CECAFA organised tournaments.

The ZFA was admitted as a full member of the CAF in March 2017 but lost membership four months later.

In March 2017, the Zanzibar Football Association voted on whether to change their name to Zanzibar Football Federation, which succeeded.

Staff

Continental Representation

Football stadiums in Zanzibar

References

External links

Zanzibar
Sports organizations established in 1926
Football in Africa not associated with FIFA